The Doctor and the Saint is a book written by Arundhati Roy. It was published in 2017 by Haymarket Books.

Reception
The New Indian Express wrote in a review "As Roy explains in the preface to this book, The Doctor and the Saint looks at the practice of caste in India, through the prism of the present as well as the past.”

The Firstpost wrote in a review "The Doctor and the Saint is strongest when it sets about its primary task: to scrutinise the historiography of Mohandas Karamchand Gandhi, and to remind readers of some inconvenient truths about the man, facts that make the Mahatma’s mythologists very uncomfortable indeed."

References

2017 non-fiction books
Indian non-fiction books
Haymarket Books books